Grant Township is one of twelve townships in Adams County, Iowa, USA.  At the 2010 census, its population was 201.

Geography
According to the USGS, it contains two cemeteries: Salem and Stringtown. Stringtown is a hamlet in Grant Township.

References

External links
 US-Counties.com
 City-Data.com

Townships in Adams County, Iowa
Townships in Iowa